François du Toit is a South African rugby union player, currently playing with Spanish División de Honor side FC Barcelona. His usual position is hooker.

Career
He came through the  youth system and played for them at various youth levels.

He was then also included in the squad for the 2012 Currie Cup Premier Division.

He also represented  in the 2011 and 2012 Varsity Cup competitions.

He was a member of the Pumas side that won the Vodacom Cup for the first time in 2015, beating  24–7 in the final. Du Toit made four appearances during the season, scoring one try.

Barcelona

After the 2016 Currie Cup, Du Toit joined Spanish División de Honor side FC Barcelona.

References

South African rugby union players
Living people
1990 births
Golden Lions players
Pumas (Currie Cup) players
Rugby union players from Johannesburg
South Africa Under-20 international rugby union players
Rugby union hookers